USS Woodrow R. Thompson has been the name of more than one United States Navy ship, and may refer to:

 , a destroyer escort scheduled for construction during World War II but cancelled on 6 June 1944
 , a destroyer launched in 1946 but never completed

United States Navy ship names